The Canadian Junior Football League (CJFL) is a national Major Junior Canadian football league consisting of 19 teams playing in five provinces across Canada. The teams compete annually for the Canadian Bowl. Many CJFL players move on to professional football careers in the Canadian Football League (CFL) and elsewhere.

Formed May 8, 1974, the CJFL's formal mission statement is: "The Canadian Junior Football League provides the opportunity for young men aged 17 to 22 to participate in highly competitive post-high school football that is unique in Canada. The goal of the league is to foster community involvement and yield a positive environment by teaching discipline, perseverance and cooperation. The benefits of the league are strong camaraderie, national competition and life-long friends."

A handful of standout players are typically signed directly to CFL rosters each season, while U Sports permits up to two years of play in leagues such as the CJFL before a player begins to lose eligibility.

The 9-team Quebec Junior Football League was formerly part of the CJFL, but eventually withdrew and now operates independently. Meanwhile, The Ontario Football Conference (OFC) consists of two divisions: Varsity Division (ages 11 to 19) and Junior Division (ages 17 to 22). While the Junior Division remains affiliated to the CJFL and its teams compete for the Canadian Bowl, the Varsity Division is operated solely by the OFC.

Current teams

Ontario Football Conference

Prairie Football Conference

British Columbia Football Conference

Defunct teams
Grand River Predators (Kitchener, Ontario)
GTA Bears (2012-2013, Brampton, Ontario)
Brampton Bears (2009-2011, Brampton, Ontario)
Abbotsford Air Force (Abbotsford, B.C.)
North Shore Cougars 1961-1973 (North Vancouver, B.C.)
North Vancouver Argos (North Vancouver, B.C.)
North Shore Broncos 1974-1990
Richmond Raiders (1978-1992, Richmond, B.C.)
Vancouver Meralomas 1925-1990
Tri-City Bulldogs (Vancouver Meralomas, 1925–1990, then 1991–2004 in Coquitlam, B.C.)
Vancouver Trojans (Renfrew Trojans 1974–1993) (Burnaby, B.C.)
Red Deer Packers (Red Deer, Alberta)
Calgary Mohawks (Calgary, Alberta)
Calgary Cougars (Calgary, Alberta)
Medicine Hat Rattlers (Medicine Hat, Alberta)
Regina Rams (Regina, Saskatchewan, moved to the CIS)
Rosemount Bombers (Montreal, Quebec)
St-Leonard Cougars (Montreal, Quebec)
Fort Garry Lions (Winnipeg, Manitoba)
St. Vital Mustangs (Winnipeg, Manitoba)
Winnipeg Hawkeyes (Winnipeg, Manitoba)
Winnipeg Rods (Winnipeg, Manitoba)
Brampton Satellites (Brampton, Ontario)
Brantford Bisons (Brantford, Ontario)
Cornwall Emards (Cornwall, Ontario)
Niagara Raiders (St. Catharines, Ontario)
Oshawa Hawkeyes (Oshawa, Ontario)
Ottawa Junior Riders (Ottawa, Ontario, moved back to the QJFL after 2005)
Sault Ste. Marie Storm (Sault Ste. Marie, Ontario)
Thunder Bay Giants (Thunder Bay, Ontario)
Chateauguay Raiders (Chateauguay, Quebec)
Laval Scorpions (Laval, Quebec)
Notre-Dame-de-Grace Maple Leafs (Montreal, Quebec, merged with the Verdun Invictus, renamed to the Verdun Maple Leafs, then the Montreal Junior Alouettes, and finally the Montreal Junior Concordes)
St. Hubert Rebelles (Saint-Hubert, Quebec)
Verdun Shamcats (Verdun, Quebec)
Ville-Émard Juveniles (Ville-Émard, Quebec)
Toronto Junior Argonauts, (Toronto, Ontario)
Sherbrooke Blitz,  (Quebec)
Quebec City Citadelles, (Quebec)
South Shore Cobras, (St-Hubert, Quebec)
Burlington Braves

Champions by city since 1947
Leader-Post Trophy, 1908–1973; Armadale Cup, 1974–1988; Canadian Bowl, 1989-present. 
 Saskatoon, Saskatchewan - Saskatoon Hilltops 22 times - 2019, 2018, 2017, 2016, 2015, 2014, 2012, 2011, 2010, 2007, 2003, 2002, 2001, 1996, 1991, 1985, 1978, 1969, 1968, 1959, 1958, 1953.
 Regina, Saskatchewan - 17 times, Regina Rams 16 times, 1998, 1997, 1995, 1994, 1993, 1987, 1986, 1981, 1980, 1976, 1975, 1973, 1971, 1970, 1966;  Regina Thunder  1 time, 2013.
 Edmonton, Alberta -  8 times, Edmonton Huskies 2005, 2004, 1964, 1963, 1962; Edmonton Wildcats 1983, 1977, 1967.
 Hamilton, Ontario -  5 times, Hamilton Hurricanes 1972; Hamilton Jr. Tiger Cats 1951, 1950; Hamilton Jr. Wildcats 1949, 1948. 
 Ottawa, Ontario - Ottawa Sooners 4 times, 1992, 1984, 1979, 1974.
 Nanaimo, British Columbia - Vancouver Island Raiders 3 times, 2009, 2008, 2006. 
 Windsor, Ontario - Windsor AKO Fratmen 3 times, 1999, 1954, 1952. 
 Winnipeg, Manitoba - Winnipeg Rods 3 times, 1961, 1956, 1955. 
 Kelowna, British Columbia - Okanagan Sun 3 times, 2022, 2000, 1988.  
 Calgary, Alberta - Calgary Colts 2 times, 1990, 1989. 
 Vancouver, British Columbia -  2 times, Renfrew Trojans 1982; Vancouver Blue Bombers 1947. 
 Montreal, Quebec -  2 times, Notre-Dame-de-Grace Maple Leafs 1965; Montreal Rosemount Bombers 1960. 
 Toronto, Ontario - Toronto Parkdale Lions 1 time, 1957.  
 Langley, British Columbia - Langley Rams 2021.
The national championship was contested from 1908 to 1946 with breaks for the World Wars and an additional break in the mid-1930s.  In these years the championship was won by teams from Toronto (7 times), Montreal (6 times), Hamilton (4 times), Regina (2 times), and once each by Vancouver, Winnipeg, Calgary, Ottawa, Petrolia, St. Thomas, Woodstock, and London.

References

External links
 

 
3
Sports leagues established in 1974
1974 establishments in Canada